Henri Kontinen and Jarkko Nieminen were the defending champions, and they successfully defended their title, beating Jonathan Marray and Philipp Petzschner in the final, 7–6(7–2), 6–4.

Seeds

Draw

Draw

References 
 Main Draw

IPP Open - Doubles
2014 Doubles